The 2014 Challenger Ciudad de Guayaquil was a professional tennis tournament played on clay courts. It was the tenth edition of the tournament which is part of the 2014 ATP Challenger Tour. It took place in Guayaquil, Ecuador between November 10 and November 16, 2014.

Singles main-draw entrants

Seeds

 1 Rankings are as of November 3, 2014.

Other entrants
The following players received wildcards into the singles main draw:
  Pablo Cuevas
  Gonzalo Escobar
  Diego Quiróz
  Giovanni Lapentti

The following players received entry from the qualifying draw:
  Pedro Cachín
  José Hernández
  Renzo Olivo
  Grzegorz Panfil

The following player received entry by a lucky loser spot:
  Duilio Beretta

Champions

Singles

  Pablo Cuevas def.  Paolo Lorenzi by walkover

Doubles

  Máximo González /  Guido Pella def.  Pere Riba /  Jordi Samper-Montaña, 2–6, 7–6(7–3), [10–5]

External links
Official Website

Challenger Ciudad de Guayaquil
Challenger Ciudad de Guayaquil
Tennis tournaments in Ecuador